1935 Emperor's Cup Final was the 15th final of the Emperor's Cup competition. The final was played at Meiji Jingu Gaien Stadium in Tokyo on June 2, 1935. Kyungsung FC won the championship.

Overview
Kyungsung FC won their 1st title, by defeating Tokyo Bunri University 6–1. Kyungsung FC was featured a squad consisting of Kim Yong-sik, Lee Yoo-hyung and Kim Sung-gan.

Match details

See also
1935 Emperor's Cup

References

Emperor's Cup
1935 in Japanese football